Abba Kabir Yusuf (born 5 January 1963) is a Nigerian politician who is the governor-elect of Kano State. He served as a commissioner in the Executive Council of Kano State from 2011 to 2015. In 2023, he was elected governor of Kano State.

Background 
Abba ibn Muhammadu Kabir ibn Danmakwayon Kano Yusuf ibn Muhammad Bashir ibn Galadiman Kano Yusuf ibn Sarkin Kano Abdullahi Maje Karofi ibn Sarkin Kano Ibrahim Dabo is from the Sullubawa part of Genawa Clan of the Fulani, on the maternal side he is related to Walin Zazzau Sheikh Umarul Wali ibn Galadiman Zazzau Malam Ahmadu, his paternal grandmother Zainab ibna Malam Saidu Limamin Huggalawa is from the family of Limamin Huggalawa in Bichi, his maternal grandmother Khadijat Naja'atu is related to Gwani Mukhtar who was the leader of the Fulani Jihad in the Kanem-Bornu Empire.

Education 
Abba was born in Gaya local government area of Kano State, Nigeria. He went to Sumaila primary school and later to Government Secondary school Lautai, Gumel Local Government Area (now Jigawa State), where he graduated with First School Leaving Certificate in 1980. Later on, he got admitted into Federal Polytechnic, Mubi, where he obtained his national diploma in civil engineering in 1985. 

He later obtained a higher national diploma in civil engineering, and certificate and specialization on water resources/environmental engineering in 1989 from Kaduna Polytechnic, he did his National Youth Service Corps at Kaduna Environmental Protection Agency from 1989 to 1990. He is also a holder of postgraduate diploma in management, and obtained master's degree in business administration from Bayero University Kano.

Political career 

Abba was the formal Commissioner of Ministry of Works, Housing and Transport (Kano State), Abba contested in 2019 gubernatorial election held in 2019, and he was defeated by the current governor of Kano State Abdullahi Umar Ganduje. Abba took the case to court to claim himself as the rightful elected governor, after all, the court dismissed the case.

References 

Living people
1963 births
20th-century Nigerian politicians
Bayero University Kano alumni
Politicians from Kano
Ahmadu Bello University alumni
Kaduna Polytechnic alumni